Mirzo Tursunzoda was a Tajikistani poet. 

Mirzo Tursunzoda may also refer to several places in Tajikistan, named after the poet:
Tursunzoda, a city in western Tajikistan
Tursunzoda District, a former district in western Tajikistan
Mirzo Tursunzoda, Hisor, part of the city Hisor
Mirzo Tursunzoda, Rudaki District, a town in Rudaki District
Mirzo Tursunzoda, Shahrinav District, a town in Shahrinav District
Tursunzoda, Shahriston District, a village in Shahriston District